De Stijl  is the second studio album by the American rock duo the White Stripes, released on June 20, 2000, on Sympathy for the Record Industry. The album reached number 38 on Billboard'''s Independent Albums chart in 2002, when The White Stripes' popularity began to grow.

De Stijl ("the style" in English) was a Dutch art movement, which included the painter Mondrian. Vocalist Jack White had been an admirer of the style for some time, especially of furniture designer Gerrit Rietveld. Rietveld designed the Rietveld Schröder House, which Jack and Meg White visited while on tour in the Netherlands. De Stijl was dedicated to both Rietveld and Blind Willie McTell.

After the tour began for De Stijl'', White closed his upholstery shop.

On February 5, 2008, Canadian media reported that former Radio-Canada host Dominique Payette filed a lawsuit against the White Stripes for using a nine-second clip of her interview with a little girl at the beginning of "Jumble, Jumble". She demanded $70,000 in damages and the removal of the album from store shelves. The dispute was settled out of court.

The re-issued vinyl LP version of the record was pressed at United Record Pressing in Nashville, Tennessee and mastered all-analog from the original master tapes.

Track listing
All songs written by Jack White except where noted.

Personnel
The White Stripes
Jack White – lead vocals, guitar, piano, double bass on "I'm Bound to Pack It Up", production
Meg White – drums, tambourine, backing vocals on "Your Southern Can Is Mine", shaker & floortom on "I'm Bound to Pack It Up"

Additional musicians
John Szymanski – harmonica on "Hello Operator"
Paul Henry Ossy – violin on "I'm Bound to Pack It Up", electric violin on "Why Can't You Be Nicer to Me?"

Chart positions

Certifications and sales

References

2000 albums
The White Stripes albums
Albums produced by Jack White
Sympathy for the Record Industry albums
Third Man Records albums